Rhombophryne guentherpetersi is a frog of the family Microhylidae. It is endemic to northern Madagascar and known from the Tsaratanana Massif. It is a rare species that suffers from habitat loss and degradation. It occurs in the Tsaratanana Reserve but the reserve borders are ambiguous, complicating management of the area.

References 

guentherpetersi
Amphibians described in 1974
Taxa named by Jean Marius René Guibé
Endemic frogs of Madagascar